South Pacific Pictures is a New Zealand television production company. The company produces drama series, mini-series, telemovies and feature films for the domestic market and international market. SPP's largest property is Shortland Street the half-hour soap opera for TVNZ 2.
In 2006, the company released Sione's Wedding and in 2002, the Oscar-nominated feature film Whale Rider. In 1998 the company produced the feature film, What Becomes of the Broken Hearted?, the sequel to Once Were Warriors.

In May 2000, the company moved from Browns Bay (Auckland) to a new purpose built studio complex in Henderson, West Auckland.

SPP is in a joint venture with Australian company SLR Productions to produce animated shows aimed at international markets and also has a 50% interest in Satellite Media and has also created a joint venture known as Kura Productions with Quinton Hita to produce programming for the Māori Television Service.

South Pacific Pictures was founded by CEO John Barnett.

Film

Television

Current productions

1980s

1990s

2000s

2010s–20s

Television films

References

External links
 South Pacific Pictures Website

Film production companies of New Zealand
Television production companies of New Zealand
Companies based in Auckland
Mass media in Auckland
All3Media
New Zealand companies established in 1988
Mass media companies established in 1988
West Auckland, New Zealand